Sheila Allen may refer to:

 Sheila Matthews Allen (1929–2013), American actress
 Sheila Allen (sociologist) (1930–2009), English sociologist and academic
 Sheila Allen (English actress) (1932–2011), English actress